Ngriil is a village on the north coast of Babeldaob, in the Ngarchelong state of Palau.

References 

Ngarchelong
Populated places in Palau